Roman Yazvinskyy (born 30 November 1986 in Lviv) is a Ukrainian luger who competed in the mid-2000s. He competed in the men's doubles event at the 2006 Winter Olympics in Turin, but crashed out toward the end of the first run. Yazvinskyy was sent to a hospital with an unspecified head injury.

References

External links
 
 
 

1986 births
Living people
Ukrainian male lugers
Olympic lugers of Ukraine
Lugers at the 2006 Winter Olympics
Sportspeople from Lviv